Joshua A.C. Newman is an American role-playing game designer.

Career
Newman is the designer of the Indie role-playing games Under the Bed (2005), Shock: Social Science Fiction (2006), Beowulf (2008), Shock:Human Contact (2010), and The Bloody-Handed Name of Bronze (2016).  His publishing imprint is called the glyphphress.

In 2012, Joshua A.C. Newman worked with Vincent Baker on a new version of the Mechaton rules as Mobile Frame Zero 001: Rapid Attack (2012), and Newman was able to use this for a successful Kickstarter. Rapid Attack was followed by Mobile Frame Zero 002: Intercept Orbit, a carrier-based spaceship battle game in the same universe.

Personal life
He resides in Northampton, Massachusetts, where he is also a book and graphic designer. He teaches game design at the University of Massachusetts, Amherst College of Information and Computer Sciences. He also teaches in an alternative high school in Holyoke, Massachusetts.

The homepage of the glyphpress leads to Newman's blog, xenoglyph, concerned with many forms of speculative art and design, not limited to games.

Roleplaying bibliography
 Under the Bed
 Shock: Social Science Fiction
 Shock: Human Contact
 Beowulf

Newman has also contributed to the book design of several other indie roleplaying games.
 Dogs in the Vineyard
 The Mountain Witch
 Bliss Stage
 Misspent Youth

References

External links  
 the glyphpress home page, featuring the xenoglyph blog
 the glyphpress Forum on The Forge

Indie role-playing game designers
Living people
People from Northampton, Massachusetts
Place of birth missing (living people)
Role-playing game designers
Role-playing game writers
Year of birth missing (living people)